Azerbaijan National Academy of Sciences (ANAS), located in Baku, is the main state research organization and the primary body that conducts research and coordinates activities in the fields of science and social sciences in Azerbaijan. It was established on 23 January 1945.

The President of ANAS is Acad. Ramiz Mehdiyev.

One section of the ANAS is Republican Seismic Survey Center of Azerbaijan National Academy of Sciences.

History 
The Academy was based on the Azerbaijan Society for Scientific Research and Studies, which was first affiliated with Baku State University and later with the USSR Academy of Sciences.

In 1923 the Azerbaijan Society for Researches and Studies that included history, ethnography, economics, and natural sciences, was established as the leading scientific institution of Azerbaijan by the initiative of Nariman Narimanov. In 1929 the Society was reorganized into Azerbaijan State Scientific Research Institute (ASSRI). ASSRI were coordinating scientific research works, and training scientific cadres for specialized high and secondary schools. In 1932, the Azerbaijani Branch of the Transcaucasian Affiliate of the USSR Academy of Sciences, consisting of 11 divisions and several committees, was organized on the basis of ASSRI. The head of the Branch was A. Ruhulla. Famous Russian scientists such as Ivan Gubkin, Alexander Grossheim, I. Meshshaninov, Iosif Yesman, and Azerbaijani scholars such as Bakir Chobanzadeh, Musa Afandiyev, Veli Khuluflu, A. Mammadov, Salman Mumtaz, A. Taghizadeh, etc. conducted scientific researches here.

In 1935, Azerbaijani Branch of the Transcaucasian Affiliate of the USSR Academy of Sciences was reorganized into the Azerbaijani Affiliate of the Academy of Sciences of the USSR. Chemical, Botany, Zoology, History, Ethnography and Archeology, Language and Literature research institutions, as well as the Divisions of Energy, Physics, Geology, and Soil Science were established on the base of the existing departments of the Branch.

In 1945, the USSR Council of People's Commissars ordered the society to be reorganized into the Academy of Sciences of the Azerbaijan SSR. During its first year, the Academy numbered 15 members; Uzeyir Hajibeyov and Samad Vurgun among them.

In accord with the presidential decree (May 15, 2001), the Azerbaijan Academy of Sciences was granted the status of the "National Academy of Sciences" (ANAS), after 2 years ANAS was given the status of the supreme state body carrying out the scientific and scientific-technical policy of Azerbaijan. Its Charter was granted the state document.

Following the presidential decrees dated January 12, 2004, and 5 May 2004, the Encyclopedia of Azerbaijan was a part of ANAS and the Scientific Center of the National Encyclopedia of Azerbaijan was established.

The Presidium is currently located in the historical Ismailiyya building on Istiglaliyyat Street in the center of Baku.

Charter of ANAS

The Directions of the functions of the Academy 

The functions of Azerbaijan National Academy of Science include the organization of scientific activity; carrying out scientific researches covering various scientific fields; coordinating and directing scientific researches of all scientific organizations and universities across the country; implementing state policy on scientific. ANAS represents Azerbaijan in different countries and international scientific events takes measures in order to improve the scientific infrastructure and modernize the material and technical basis of science. Its functions also include strengthening the relations between science and industries, to create mechanisms for the implementation of applied scientific research in line with the needs of the market, and innovative environment for innovative entrepreneurship, developing new types of activities, making proposals for the transfer and acquisition of advanced technologies, and suggestions on the organization of techno-parks, innovation zones, incubation services, technology transfer centers, and shaping the innovation system in Azerbaijan.

Duties of the Academy 

Azerbaijan National Academy of Sciences is responsible for ensuring scientific reforms; organizing scientific researches in various fields of science; providing the organization, coordination, development of researches. The Academy should determine the strategy and priorities of scientific and technical development, participate in the preparation of state programs, make decisions, establish scientific-production-experimental plants, and various economic enterprises and organize interaction between science and production.

Organizing and implementing scientific researches that aimed at the protection of culture, traditions, and customs, strengthening ties between science and education, representing Azerbaijan in international events related to scientific issues, participating in the organization and implementation of international scientific projects,  promoting the creation of high-tech manufacturing sites and businesses based on scientific achievements; conducting regular monitoring, providing development of science in the regions of Azerbaijan are also include responsibilities of ANAS. The Academy applies a single center-management model of research carried out in scientific research institutions, takes measures on effectiveness assessment.

Academy's rights 

The Academy has rights such as follows:

 To prepare proposals in order to improve legislation in the field of science;
 To send inquire for the information (documents) to state and local self-governing bodies concerning science; 
 To issue decisions and orders that are subject to execution by the subordinate scientific institutions and to control their implementation;
 To implement the orders and decrees of the president of the Academy and decisions of the Presidium of Academy;
 To cooperate with the relevant international organizations, state bodies of foreign countries, to study the experience of foreign countries; 
 To establish international scientific laboratories and involve independent experts and specialist in the Academy;
 To make suggestions on the improvement of the labor, social and living conditions, material security and protection of the employees of the Presidium of the Academy and staff of the Academy;
 To cooperate with government agencies in the preparation of recommendations for the implementation of state-run tasks on scientific and technical development; 
 To establish educational institutions and scientific and educational centers in accordance with the Law of the Republic of Azerbaijan "On Education";
 In accordance with the Law of the Republic of Azerbaijan "On Education", to prepare specialists, including their higher education, magistracy, doctorate, and dissertation;
 To independently evaluate social processes, socio-economic, scientific-technical and cultural development, as well as the ecological situation and make proposals on these issues; 
 To publish scientific journals, magazines, encyclopedias, newspapers and scientific-mass magazines reflecting the activity of the Academy;

Structure 

ANAS includes several organizations such as Scientific Production Association "Cybernetics", Central Scientific Library, Scientific Center operates under the Presidium of ANAS. Approximately 10,000 employees (4939 scientific workers, 664 doctors of sciences, 2026 philosophy doctors) work in ANAS.

The structure of the Academy consists of the Presidium of the Academy staff and scientific institutions, as well as regional scientific departments and centers, scientific and social services. The structure and staff of the Academy are approved by the Ministers` Cabinet of Azerbaijan. The Academy performs its duties directly and through its departments.
 
The Presidium of the Academy is the collegial executive body of the Academy. The Academy's activity is led by the president of the Academy. The President of the Academy is elected for a term of five years at the General Meeting of the Academy and is approved by the President of Azerbaijan.

Azerbaijan National Academy of Sciences is divided into 6 departments (altogether they affiliate about 40 research and cultural institutions throughout the country), namely:
  Department of Physical, Mathematical and Technical Sciences
 Department of Chemical Sciences
 Department of Earth Sciences 
 Department of Biological and Medical Sciences
 Department of Humanities
 Department of Social Sciences

The Academy has regional branches in Ganja, Shaki, and Lankaran.

The Academy includes the Institute of Radiation Problems.

Members 

The full members of the Academy are selected from among the Corresponding Members of the Academy, who are the citizens of Azerbaijan, and conduct scientific researches, and enrich scientific knowledge.

Just citizens of the Republic of Azerbaijan can be elected as a correspondent member of the Academy. These candidates should have weighty services in the development of science abroad, as well as in Azerbaijan.

Foreign members of the Academy are selected among the scholars who make valuable contributions to the world and Azerbaijani science of foreign countries. Honorary members of the Academy are selected from among the citizens of Azerbaijan, foreigners, and stateless persons, recognized worldwide as the state, public, scientific and cultural figures. Honorary members of the Academy may also be elected at the Presidium along with the General Meeting of the Academy. The full and correspondent members of the Academy are selected for a lifetime.

The number of full and correspondent members of the Academy is determined by the president of Azerbaijan, taking into consideration the decision of the General Meeting of the Academy.
Members of the Academy should assist in the application of scientific achievements, prepare scientific staff, carry out scientific-organizational assignments of the Presidium, and participate in the General Meetings of the Academy and its scientific unit.

Members of the Academy have rights to require the Academy's Presidium to create conditions for them to carry out their scientific researches; to present scientific and scientific-organizational issues for the discussion of the Presidium of the Academy and the bureau of the scientific unit which they are members, to discuss such matters in the General Assembly of the Academy and the Scientific Unit through the Presidium and the Office of Scientific Divisions. When a member of the Academy fails to perform his duties in accordance with the Charter of ANAS, the Academy's Board of Directors discusses it individually and submits it to the General Meeting of the Academy.

The foreign member of the Academy presents to the Presidium of the Academy the proposals on the development of scientific researches and the expansion of international scientific cooperation in the scientific department. The elections of the full, correspondent, foreign and honorary members of the Academy are held no less than once every three years.

The Academy has a two-tier membership. Currently, there are 57 active members and 104 corresponding members. Membership is granted through a vote. The Academy also grants honorary memberships.

Presidents 

The main executive figure in the academy is the President of Azerbaijan National Academy of Sciences who is elected by members of the Academy.

Vice-presidents 
 First Vice-President Academician Isa Habibbayli
 First Vice-President Academician Ibrahim Guliyev
 Vice-President Academician Tofig Nagiyev
 Vice-President Academician Nargiz Pashayeva
 Vice-President Academician Rasim Alguliyev
 Vice-President Academician Irada Huseynova
 Academician-secretary, corresponding member of ANAS Aminaga Sadigov

International relations

Agreements 

Azerbaijan National Academy of Sciences (ANAS) signed memorandums, memorandums of understanding, agreements, agreements of understanding on scientific cooperation, cooperation in the field of science and technology together with the relevant scientific academies in the world such as the Polish Academy of Sciences,  Turkish Scientific and Technological Research Council (TSTRC), the Academy of Sciences of the Republic of Tajikistan, the Moldova Academy of Sciences, Latvian Academy of Sciences, Spanish Academy of Economics and Finance, Turkish Academy (Kazakh Academy), Serbian Academy of Science and Art, the Israeli Academy of Humanitarian and Medical Sciences, Turkish Center for Caspian Studies.

Criticism 
The Academy was criticized by several members of the National Assembly, in July 2012 for publishing a children's tale called "The Unwanted Son-In-Law," which contained vulgar language and graphic scenes of incest. The story was published in 2007 in the sixth volume of the ambiguously titled "Tales" anthology. Kamila Aliyeva, a member of the Science and Education Committee was quoted as saying "I wonder if they were aware of the contents of the book," she asked. "If they were, it is shameful. And if they were not, it is also shameful."

Statements on Armenia and Armenians 
According to the institute director of ANAS, Yagub Mahmudov, prior to 1918 "there was never an Armenian state in the South Caucasus". According to Mahmudov, Ilham Aliyev's statement in which he said that Irevan is our [Azerbaijan's] historic land, and we, Azerbaijanis must return to these historic lands, was based "historical facts" and "historical reality". Mahmudov also stated that the claim that Armenian's are the most ancient people in the region is based on propaganda, and claimed that Armenians are non-natives of the region, having only arrived in the area after Russian victories over Iran and the Ottoman Empire in the first half of the 19th century. The institute director also said:

Affiliations
The academy is a member of the Caucasus University Association.

See also 
 ANAS Central Library of Science

References

External links

 Official website 

Azerbaijan
Research institutes in Azerbaijan
Research institutes established in 1945
1945 establishments in Azerbaijan
1945 establishments in the Soviet Union
Science and technology in Azerbaijan
USSR Academy of Sciences
Education in Baku
Scientific organizations established in 1945
Members of the International Council for Science
Members of the International Science Council
Academies of Azerbaijan
 
Armenian